Luis Román Rolón (born July 13, 1968 in Vega Baja) is a retired boxer from Puerto Rico, who competed in the bantamweight (– 54 kg) division. As an amateur he won the silver medal at the 1986 World Amateur Boxing Championships in Reno. Later he was disqualified after failing a drug test.

After having won the gold medal at the 1987 Pan American Games Rolón represented his native country at the 1988 Summer Olympics in Seoul, South Korea, where he was defeated in the second round of the light flyweight division (– 48 kg). In his professional career he retired in 2000, with a record of nineteen wins (12 ko's), four losses and one draw.

See also
List of sportspeople sanctioned for doping offences

References
 
 

1968 births
Living people
People from Vega Baja, Puerto Rico
Bantamweight boxers
Boxers at the 1987 Pan American Games
Boxers at the 1988 Summer Olympics
Doping cases in boxing
Puerto Rican sportspeople in doping cases
Olympic boxers of Puerto Rico
Puerto Rican male boxers
Pan American Games gold medalists for Puerto Rico
Pan American Games medalists in boxing
Medalists at the 1987 Pan American Games